KWKM (95.7 FM) is a radio station  broadcasting a hot adult contemporary format. It is licensed to St. Johns, Arizona, United States. The station is owned by Km Radio of St. Johns, L.L.C. and features programming from ABC Radio.

References

External links
 

WKM